Alena Svobodová (born 19 July 1957) is a Czech rower. She competed for Czechoslovakia in the women's quadruple sculls event at the 1976 Summer Olympics.

References

External links
 
 

1957 births
Living people
Czech female rowers
Olympic rowers of Czechoslovakia
Rowers at the 1976 Summer Olympics
Rowers from Prague